

Overview 

Khanom thuai or Khanom thuai talai (as Referred to in some areas) is a traditional Thai dessert that has a sweet taste in contrast with a salty taste. The uniqueness of this dish is that it is served in small ceramic bowls (hence the name dessert in a small bowl) with a small wooden spoon for taking out the dessert itself. The basic ingredients for making this dish in the modern day consist of rice flour, cane sugar, salt, and coconut milk. However, traditionally, a few extra ingredients can be added, which are jasmine-infused water and tapioca flour. There are two parts of the Khanom thuai, the body, and the face. The body is at the bottom with the face resting on it. In the past, the body section will have a light brown color from coconut sugar. However, nowadays, people are applying a variety of ingredients to change different aspects of the desert (taste and looks). For example, by applying pandan leaf,  the body will change color to white and by applying butterfly pea, the body will change color to light blue. In Thailand, Khanom thuai is a well-known dessert across the country and is commonly eaten alongside Boat noodles (a type of noodle-dish in Thailand). It can also be purchased at street shops around the country.

Traditional Khanom Thuai 
In the past, Khanom Thuai was generally made only for important cultural dates and festivals, such as weddings, ordinations, and events similar to Songkran day. This is due to the number of recourses both manpower and ingredients that are required are quite high. In addition, the recipe for making this delicacy changes drastically over time, and for the dessert to be more suitable for different purposes, for example, Khanom Thuai which is given to the monks as an offering has a different recipe than normal ones, in this case,  the recipe was adjusted so that it is more difficult to becomes doughy.

Modern Khanom Thuai 
There are many variation of Khanom Thuai at the present date. Adding different colors and other ingredients , such as  pandan leaf or young coconut, is a popular act that is commonly done in stores across Bangkok. 
Price of Khanom Thuai depending on where you buy it. It can vary from 2 or 5 bath per piece up to 10 bath.

Recipe 
First, dissolve the palm sugar and mix it with 300ml of coconut milk, 2 ½ tablespoon of rice flour and ¼ teaspoon of pandan essence in a bowl until smooth and sieve into a bowl.
Mix the other 300ml of coconut milk with 2 ½ tablespoon rice flour and a pinch of salt until smooth. You can add the salt to your desired taste for the top layer but we recommend no more than ¼ teaspoon. Sieve this mixture into a separate bowl.
Next in a steamer, heat up small cups for a few minutes. Then pour in the first, sweet mixture ¾ full in each cup. Steam the sweet coconut mixture for roughly 15 minutes to set.
Next, carefully pour the remaining salty coconut milk mixture into the remaining ¼ of the small cups. Cover and steam for a further 20 minutes.
Once finished, set the Khanom Thuai aside to cool and serve at room temperature.

See also 
 Coconut pudding
 List of Thai desserts
 Serabi

References

External links 

Steamed Pandanus Cake on enjoythaifood.com

Thai desserts and snacks
Foods containing coconut